Ard is an unincorporated community in Yell County, Arkansas, United States.

Notes

Unincorporated communities in Yell County, Arkansas
Unincorporated communities in Arkansas